GlaubeLiebeTod ("FaithLoveDeath") is the ninth studio album by the German industrial metal band Oomph!. It was released in March 2006.

GlaubeLiebeTod was released in three versions: a basic album with jewel case and no booklet; a standard album with jewel case and a booklet and a premium album as a digipak with enhanced CD-ROM content and two bonus tracks (see below).

The album achieved Gold status in early September 2015 having sold more than 100,000 copies in Germany.

Track listing
All music by Oomph! except track 4 (by Ennio Morricone and Oomph!). All lyrics by Dero Goi except track 6 (by Erich Kästner).

 Gott ist ein Popstar! ("God is a popstar") - 3:53
 Das letzte Streichholz ("The last match") - 3:37
 Träumst du? ("Are you dreaming?") - 3:57
 Die Schlinge ("The noose") - 3:58
 Du willst es doch auch ("You want it too") - 3:27
 Eine Frau spricht im Schlaf ("A woman talks in her sleep") - 3:58
 Mein Schatz ("My sweetheart") - 3:38
 Dreh dich nicht um ("Don't turn around") - 3:28
 Land in Sicht ("Land in sight") - 4:06
 Tanz in den Tod ("Dance into death") - 3:26
 Ich will deine Seele ("I want your soul") - 3:20
 Zuviel Liebe kann dich töten ("Too much love can kill you") - 3:48
 Wenn du mich lässt ("If you let me") (digipak bonus track) - 3:51
 Menschsein ("Being human")  (digipak bonus track) - 3:44

Personnel
Dero Goi – lead vocals, drums
Andreas Crap – guitars and keyboards
Robert Flux – samples and guitars

Music Videos
 "Gott ist ein Popstar!"
 "Das letzte Streichholz"
 "Träumst du?"
 "Die Schlinge"

Charts

Weekly charts

Year-end charts

References

Oomph! albums
2006 albums
GUN Records albums
German-language albums